We Maids (Spanish: Nosotras las sirvientas) is a 1951 Mexican romantic comedy film directed by Zacarías Gómez Urquiza and starring Alma Rosa Aguirre, Domingo Soler and Rubén Rojo.

The film's art direction was by Francisco Marco Chillet.

Cast 
 Alma Rosa Aguirre as Claudia
 Domingo Soler as Don Ernesto
 Rubén Rojo as Felipe
 Nora Veryán as Teresa
 Alfredo Varela as Enrique
 Fanny Schiller as Mamá de Teresa
 Alberto Mariscal as Manuel
 Amparo Arozamena as Tita
 Lupe Llaca as Irene
 Julio Ahuet as Chofer camión
 Salvador Quiroz as Comisario
 Miguel Aceves Mejía as Cantante
 Daniel Arroyo as Invitado a fiesta
 Josefina Burgos as Espectadora accidente
 Alfonso Carti as Policía
 Enedina Díaz de León as Espectadora accidente
 Jesús Gómez as Pretendiente de Tita
 Leonor Gómez as Pasajera en camión
 Ignacio Peón as Espectador accidente
 Manuel Trejo Morales as Comisario 2
 Mariachi Vargas
 Acela Vidaurri as Espectadora accidente

References

Bibliography 
 Amador, María Luisa. Cartelera cinematográfica, 1950-1959. UNAM, 1985.

External links 
 

1951 films
1951 romantic comedy films
Mexican romantic comedy films
1950s Spanish-language films
Films directed by Zacarías Gómez Urquiza
Mexican black-and-white films
1950s Mexican films